Joseph Harold ("Harry") Dockweiler (1920- August 1948) was a science-fiction author and literary agent.  Dockweiler was best known by his pen name Dirk Wylie.   Dockweiler was a member of The Futurians, a 1940s-era science-fiction fan community.

Biography
Dockweiler attended Brooklyn Technical High School in the 1930s, where he became friends with fellow student Frederik Pohl.

In 1934, a teen Dockweiler had a letter published in periodical Wonder Stories inquiring about "Science Fiction Week".  Both Dockweiler and Pohl dropped out of Brooklyn tech after their junior year.

In 1937, Dockweiler published a fanzine titled Fantasy Mirror. As an adult, Dockweiler wrote stories in collaboration with Frederik Pohl, Arnold Kummer Jr.  and Cyril M. Kornbluth. Dockweiler also used the pen names "Dennis Lavond" and "Elliott Whitney".

In 1937,  Dockweiler joined the Committee for the Political Advancement of Science Fiction (CPASF), a left-wing group of Futurians who supported the views of fellow member John B. Michel.

When the Futurians group fractured,  Dockweiler and Pohl followed Michel and Donald Wollheim to form the East New York Science Fiction League.  In 1940, Dockweiler married fellow Futurian Rosalind "Roz" Cohen.

Dockweiler was drafted and served as a sergeant in a military police company in World War 2.  He was stationed in Belgium during the Battle of the Bulge.  Dockweiler suffered a spine injury after jumping from a transport truck;  he was evacuated from theater and spent two years in a Veterans Administration hospital.  While hospitalized,  Dockweiler penned a letter to Amazing Stories in which he reported two instances of having witnessed an unidentified objects, in some cases rise from the ocean and returning to it.

In 1947, Dockweiler and Pohl set up the "Dirk Wylie Literary Agency".  In August 1948, Dockweiler died from tuberculosis of the spine.   After his death, Pohl and Rosalin continued to run the agency.

Works
 "Stepsons of Mars" (April 1940 Astonishing Stories) (with C M Kornbluth and Richard Wilson)
 "Vacant World" (January 1941 Super Science Stories) (with C M Kornbluth)
 Stuff (1940)
 The Mantle of Graag (1941) with Robert A. W. Lowndes and Frederik Pohl
 Something from Beyond (1941) with Robert A. W. Lowndes and Frederik Pohl 
Highwayman Of The Void  
Asteroid of the Damned (1942)  
Sky Test (1942)
Outpost of the Eons (1943)
Star of the Undead(1948) with Robert A. W. Lowndes and Frederik Pohl 
When Time Went Mad (publish posthumously in 1950) with Frederic Arnold Kummer, Jr.

References

1920 births
1948 deaths
American science fiction writers
Literary agents
Military personnel from New York City
Writers from Brooklyn
20th-century American male writers
United States Army personnel of World War II